Scrobipalpa indignella is a moth of the family Gelechiidae. It is found in southern Russia, Ukraine and from the Near East and Middle East to Afghanistan and China (Xinjiang).

The forewings are clay to leather brown. The hindwings are grey to dirty white.

References

Moths described in 1879
Scrobipalpa